{{DISPLAYTITLE:C17H16N2O}}
The molecular formula C17H16N2O (molar mass: 264.322 g/mol, exact mass: 264.1263 u) may refer to:

 Etaqualone
 Methylmethaqualone (MMQ)

Molecular formulas